West Indian boxwood may refer to:
 Casearia praecox, a species of tree in the willow family, Salicaceae
 Tabebuia rosea, a species of tree in the trumpet vine family, Bignoniaceae
 Phyllostylon brasiliensis, a species of tree in the elm family, Ulmaceae